The 2021 Giro di Sicilia (known as Il Giro di Sicilia EOLO for sponsorship reasons) was the 25th edition of the Giro di Sicilia road cycling stage race and the second edition since its revival in 2019. The race was originally scheduled for April but had been postponed due to COVID-19 pandemic restrictions, which had also caused the cancellation of the 2020 edition.

Teams 

UCI WorldTeams

 
 
 
 
 

UCI ProTeams

 
 
 
 
 
 
 
 

UCI Continental Teams

Route

Stages

Stage 1 
28 September 2021 — Avola to Licata,

Stage 2 
29 September 2021 — Selinunte (Castelvetrano) to Mondello (Palermo),

Stage 3 
30 September 2021 — Termini Imerese to Caronia,

Stage 4 
1 October 2021 — Sant'Agata di Militello to Mascali,

Classification leadership table 

 On stage 2, Maximiliano Richeze, who was third in the points classification, wore the cyclamen jersey, because first-placed Juan Sebastián Molano wore the red-and-yellow jersey as the leader of the general classification and second-placed Vincenzo Albanese wore the white-and-blue jersey as the leader of the young rider classification. On stage 3, Jakub Mareczko wore the cyclamen jersey for the same reason, though with Matteo Moschetti wearing the white-and-blue jersey.

Final classification standings

General classification

Points classification

Mountains classification

Young rider classification

Team classification

References

External links 
 

2021 UCI Europe Tour
2021 in Italian sport
September 2021 sports events in Italy
October 2021 sports events in Italy
Cycling events postponed due to the COVID-19 pandemic